Jean Guyon (1592-1663) was a French pioneer in Canada.

Jean Guyon may also refer to:
Jean Guyon (fl. early 16c), French composer
 (1794–1870),  French military surgeon
Jean Casimir Félix Guyon (1831–1920), French surgeon and urologist
 (1900-1961), French politician
Jean-Jacques Guyon (1932–2017), French equestrian 
 (born 1945), French historian